Lack is a surname. Notable people with the surname include:

 Andrew Lack (author) (born 1953), English biologist and author
 Andrew Lack (executive) (born 1947), chairman of NBC News and MSNBC
David Lack (1910–1973), British ornithologist and biologist
Eddie Lack (born 1988), Calgary Flames goaltender
Fredell Lack (1922–2017), American classical violinist
James J. Lack (born 1944), New York politician and judge
Ken Lack (1934–2001), Jamaican record producer
Mercie Lack (1894-1985), British photographer
Portia Lack (born 1961), American handball player
Simon Lack (1913–1980), Scottish actor
Stephen Lack (born 1946), Scottish painter and actor
Théodore Lack (1846–1921), French classical pianist and composer